Soulful Brass is an album by American jazz composer/arranger Oliver Nelson and pianist/entertainer Steve Allen featuring performances recorded in 1968 for the Impulse! label.

Reception
The Allmusic review by Douglas Payne awarded the album 1½ stars, stating: "Not one of Nelson's most memorable: watered-down arrangements and pop tunes framing Allen's electronic harpsichord noodling".

Track listing
All compositions by Steve Allen except as indicated
 "Torino" (Lou Garisto) - 2:03
 "Sound Machine" (Steve Allen, S. Clayton) - 3:40
 "Goin' Out of My Head / Can't Take My Eyes off You" (Teddy Randazzo, Bobby Weinstein / Bob Crewe, Bob Gaudio) - 2:50
 "Spooky" (Mike Sharpe, Harry Middlebrook) - 3:43
 "125th Street & 7th Avenue" (Oliver Nelson) - 3:55
 "Green Tambourine" (Paul Leka, Shelly Pinz) -  2:28
 "(Sittin' On) The Dock of the Bay" (Otis Redding, Steve Cropper) -  2:32
 "Goin' Great" (Stan Applebaum) - 3:11
 "Things I Should Have Said" (Steve Allen, David Allen) - 2:46
 "Go Fly A Kite" - 2:30
 "Melissa" - 3:59
 "Last Night (Was a Bad Night)" - 2:34
Recorded in Los Angeles, California, on March 15, 1968 (tracks 1, 4, 6, 8, 9, 11 7 12), and March 18, 1968 (tracks 2, 3, 5, 7 & 10)

Personnel
Steve Allen - electric harpsichord, piano
Oliver Nelson - arranger, conductor
Bobby Bryant - trumpet
Tom Scott - tenor saxophone
Roger Kellaway - piano
Barney Kessel - guitar
Larry Bunker, Jimmy Gordon - drums
Ron Carter - bass
Britt Woodman - trombone 
Grady Tate - drums

Other unknown musicians

References

Impulse! Records albums
Oliver Nelson albums
Steve Allen albums
1968 albums
Albums produced by Bob Thiele
Albums conducted by Oliver Nelson
Albums arranged by Oliver Nelson